North West 1 (not to be confused with North 1 West) was an English Rugby Union league which was at the seventh tier of the domestic competition and was available to teams in North West England.  Promoted teams moved up to North 2 West while relegated teams dropped to North West 2.  The division was abolished at the end of the 1999–00 season due to RFU restructuring with teams being transferred to either North 2 West or their relevant regional leagues such as South Lancs/Cheshire 1 or North Lancs/Cumbria.

Original teams
When league rugby began in 1987 this division contained the following teams:

Blackburn
Carlisle
Caldy
Chester
Egremont
Mid-Cheshire College 
Netherhall
Rochdale
Southport
Wigan
Wirral

North West 1 Honours

North West 1 (1987–1993)

The original North West 1 was a tier 7 league with promotion up to North Division 2 and relegation down to North West 2.

North West 1 (1993–1996)

The creation of National 5 North for the 1993–94 season meant that North West 1 dropped from being a tier 7 league to a tier 8 league for the years that National 5 North was active.

North West 1 (1996–2000)

The cancellation of National 5 North at the end of the 1995–96 season meant that North West 1 reverted to being a tier 7 league.  At the end of the 1999–00 season a further restructure of the leagues saw North West 1, North West 2 and North West 3 cancelled, along with their counterparts North East 1, North East 2 and North East 3.

Number of league titles

Aldwinians (1)
Blackburn (1)
Chester (1)
Carlisle (1)
Lymm (1)
Macclesfield (1)
Manchester (1)
New Brighton (1)
Northwich (1)
Sandbach (1)
Sedgley Park (1)
West Park St Helens (1)
Wigan (1)

Notes

References

See also
 English Rugby Union Leagues
 English rugby union system
 Rugby union in England

7